Flecha Azul is a brand of tequila produced in Jalisco, Mexico by Abraham Ancer and Aron Marquez. Mark Wahlberg invested in the company in 2021.

References

Tequila
Alcoholic drink brands
Mexican brands